Ruzunga is a town in the Bururi Province of Burundi.

References

Populated places in Burundi
Bururi Province